Jeff Piercy (born March 25, 1983) is a former Canadian football fullback who most recently played for the Hamilton Tiger-Cats of the Canadian Football League.  Piercy is an alumnus of Evan Hardy Collegiate, where he graduated in 2001.

Piercy played in college for the University of Saskatchewan and was named a Canada West All-Star in his final season.  He was selected 12th overall in the 2nd round of the 2005 CFL draft and he played mostly on special teams his first year with the Montreal Alouettes.

In 2007, Piercy was traded to the Tiger-Cats in exchange for Jason Maas.  In January 2009, Piercy retired from the CFL to pursue a Master's degree in Business Administration at Oxford.

External links
Jeff Piercy at ticats.ca

References

1983 births
Canadian football fullbacks
Hamilton Tiger-Cats players
Living people
Montreal Alouettes players
Players of Canadian football from Saskatchewan
Saskatchewan Huskies football players
Sportspeople from Saskatoon